AA Insurance is an independently operated, New Zealand-based joint venture between the New Zealand Automobile Association (NZAA) and Suncorp Group. The company offers home, contents, car insurance, and small business insurance.

Launched in 1994, the company underwrites its own policies and sells direct to New Zealanders. The company employs over 1000 staff and has 500,000+ customers with over 1,000,000+ policies.

AA Insurance supports New Zealand children's charity Variety, partners with Eden Park, and has been consistently recognised by: Reader’s Digest Most Trusted Brand (since 2011), and Quality Service Awards for Car, and Home and Contents Insurance (since 2015), Kantar Customer Leadership Index (since 2019), Canstar Blue Most Satisfied Customers (2021), and the Kantar Corporate Reputation Index (since 2015) that measures the responsibility, fairness, success/leadership and trust of 50 of New Zealand’s top corporates by revenue. AA Insurance was also named Consumer NZ People’s Choice award winner for car insurance (since 2019) and home and contents (2019 and 2020).

In 2021, AA Insurance was named New Zealand Insurance Industry Award Direct General Insurance Company of the Year for the seventh time.

AA Insurance has an AA- (Very Strong) Insurer Financial Strength Rating given by Standard and Poor's (Australia) Pty Ltd.

References

External links
 AA Insurance website
 AA Life Insurance website

Financial services companies established in 1994
Insurance companies of New Zealand